Eric Dontay Sutton (born October 24, 1972) is a former professional gridiron football defensive back in the National Football League (NFL) for the Washington Redskins and in the Canadian Football League (CFL) for the Saskatchewan Roughriders and Calgary Stampeders. He has also been a member of the Philadelphia Eagles (NFL) and Oakland Raiders (NFL).

College career
Sutton played college football for the San Diego State Aztecs from 1991 to 1994.

Professional career

National Football League
Sutton signed with the Washington Redskins as an undrafted free agent in 1995 and spent the 1995 season on the practice roster. He played in four games in 1996 while also spending time on the practice roster.

Philadelphia Eagles
Sutton signed with the Philadelphia Eagles in 1997, but was released at the end of training camp.

Saskatchewan Roughriders
Sutton signed with the Saskatchewan Roughriders in September, 1997 where he played and started in six regular season games at cornerback and recorded 18 defensive tackles and two interceptions. He also played in three post-season games, including the 85th Grey Cup where he had three defensive tackles in the loss to the Toronto Argonauts. In 1998, he started all 18 regular season games where he had 53 defensive tackles and one interception.

Oakland Raiders
In 1999, Sutton was signed by the Oakland Raiders, but was released and did not play for the team.

Saskatchewan Roughriders (II)
Sutton re-joined the Saskatchewan Roughriders in 1999 where he started in three games and recorded eight defensive tackles. However, he was released on July 29, 1999.

Calgary Stampeders
On August 16, 1999, Sutton signed a practice roster agreement with the Calgary Stampeders. Over the 1999 and 2000 seasons, he played in 18 regular season games where he had 31 defensive tackles and 11 special teams tackles.

Personal life
Sutton's son, also named Eric, was born in Regina, Saskatchewan while Sutton played for the Saskatchewan Roughriders. His son also plays professional football as a defensive back in the Canadian Football League. Following his retirement from his football career, Sutton worked for Walmart as an Asset Protection Manager.

References

1972 births
Living people
Players of American football from Torrance, California
Players of Canadian football from California
American football cornerbacks
Calgary Stampeders players
Canadian football defensive backs
Philadelphia Eagles players
Oakland Raiders players
San Diego State Aztecs football players
Saskatchewan Roughriders players
Washington Redskins players